Sara Niemietz is a vocalist, actress, musician, and composer with Broadway theatrical, soundtrack and live performance experience. She has co-produced music videos and albums with W. G. Snuffy Walden in his Taylor Made Studios since 2010. Niemietz became a featured cast member with Postmodern Jukebox in 2015. Musical influences include gospel, children's and family, stage musical, pop, rock, blues and jazz.

Albums

As headliner
LPs
 Live at the Cat Club (Skooter, 2003)
 Travel Light (2017)
Get Right (2019)
twentytwenty (2020)
Superman (2022)

EPs
 Without a Net (2006)
 Push Play  (2012)
 Christmas Favorites (2012)
  By Request (2014)
 Fountain & Vine (2015)

As featured artist

Soundtrack appearances

Singles

YouTube videos

References

External links 
 SaraNiemietz.com
 Official YouTube channel
 
 

Discographies of American artists
Jazz discographies
Pop music discographies